is a Japanese footballer who plays as a wing back for  club Kashiwa Reysol.

Club statistics
.

References

External links
Profile at Cerezo Osaka

1991 births
Living people
Waseda University alumni
Association football people from Saitama Prefecture
Japanese footballers
J2 League players
J1 League players
J3 League players
Fagiano Okayama players
Cerezo Osaka players
Cerezo Osaka U-23 players
Shimizu S-Pulse players
Kashiwa Reysol players
Association football forwards